María José Maza (born October 9, 1990 in Guayaquil) is a model and beauty pageant contestant.

Biography

Early life
She was born in Guayaquil, María José speaks Spanish and English, and she is graduated Engineering in Sales Administration at Universidad Católica de Santiago de Guayaquil.

Pageantry

Miss Ecuador 2011 
Maza competed in Miss Ecuador 2011 where she was a favorite but at the end of final night she was unplaced.

Miss Bikini International 2011 
As Miss Ecuador 2011's contestant she was designed by Miss Ecuador Organization the represent to the country at Miss Bikini International 2011 where she was on top 12 in Qingdao, China. 94 countries participated.

Miss Panamerican 2013 
She was the Ecuadorian represent to Miss Panamerican International 2013 in Los Angeles, California, United States, and she won the second crown to Ecuador.

Miss Caraibes Hibiscus 2013 
In 2013 she was designed to represent Ecuador in Miss Caraibes Habicus 2013 in Saint Maarten where she placed as 2nd Runner-up.

Miss Earth Ecuador 2014 
She was designated on August, 2014 by José Hidalgo, the director of Miss Earth Ecuador, as the national representative to compete in Miss Earth 2014.

References

External links
Official Miss Ecuador website

1990 births
Living people
Ecuadorian beauty pageant winners
Ecuadorian people of Spanish descent
Miss Earth 2014 contestants
Ecuadorian female models
21st-century Ecuadorian women